Garfa Dhirendranath Memorial High School may refer to—
 Garfa Dhirendranath Memorial Boys' High School, a higher secondary school for boys
 Garfa Dhirendranath Memorial Girls' High School, a higher secondary school for girls

Educational institution disambiguation pages